Project 1710 Макрель (NATO reporting name "Beluga") was a Russian SSA diesel-electric submarine. It was an experimental vessel used for testing propulsion systems, hull forms, and boundary-layer control techniques.

Development was undertaken by the Malakhit Design Bureau with construction at the Admiralty shipyard in St. Petersburg. 

The lone Beluga-class submarine in operation was S-553 Forel. Launched in 1986 and moth-balled around 1998, the last operation of the vessel is thought to have taken place in 1997. As of the mid-2000s, the entire project is believed to have been discontinued.

References

External links
Federation of American Scientists: Project 1710 Mackerel Beluga class
World Navies Today: Russian Submarines

Russian and Soviet navy submarine classes
1986 ships
Auxiliary ships of the Soviet Navy